Sivac is a village located in the municipality of Kula, Serbia. The village has a Serb ethnic majority with a sizable Montenegrin minority, with its population numbering 7,895 inhabitants (as of 2011 census).

History
The existence of Sivac is first mentioned in a list of settlements in Bačka from 1692. The village is divided into two connected settlements, Stari Sivac, which was historically populated by Serbs and Novi Sivac, which was historically populated by Swabians. Following World War II, Sivac was one of many villages in Vojvodina that were involved in the 'colonization' process in which refugees from across Yugoslavia were settled. Sivac was one of the few villages in Serbia in which the majority of post-war settlers were from Montenegro.

Demographics

Historical population
 1961: 11,448
 1971: 10,469
 1981: 9,979
 1991: 9,514
 2002: 8,992
 2011: 7,895

Ethnic groups
The ethnic groups as of 2002 census:
Serbs = 5,179 (57.59%)
Montenegrins = 2,703 (30.06%)
Hungarians = 425 (4.73%)
Croats = 162 (1.80%)
Yugoslavs = 54 (0.60%)

Notable people
 Čedomir Čupić, political scientist
 Milorad Vučelić, businessman, president of FK Partizan
 Milan Ivanović, former Australian football player
 Dragoje Leković, former Yugoslav football player

See also
 List of places in Serbia
 List of cities, towns and villages in Vojvodina
 Montenegrins of Serbia

References

 Slobodan Ćurčić, Broj stanovnika Vojvodine, Novi Sad, 1996.

Gallery

External links 

 “A Home for Town Planning Kula-Odzaci” Kula
 Sivac.net

Places in Bačka
West Bačka District
Kula, Serbia